The Washington Progressive Party (WAPP) is a minor political party in Washington state affiliated with the National Progressive Party. The current chair of the party is Ashley Stallworth accompanied, by vice-chair Stephanie Browne. The party advocates for leftist politics and policies including Medicare for All as Single-payer healthcare and the Green New Deal. It had three candidates running under its name in 2020, Kathryn Lewandowsky for Washington Legislative District 39, Taylor Zimmerman for Washington Legislative District 10, and Gentry Lange for Washington's Secretary of State.

Political positions

Healthcare
The WAPP supports universal, single-payer healthcare, and abortion rights.

Education
The WAPP supports universal pre-K, tuition-free public colleges and universities, Education in American Sign Language, Education in both English and a person's first language, Free lunch, Free school transportation, school mental health services, changing class sizes and hiring more teachers.

Housing
The WAPP supports an increase in public investment to create affordable housing, as well as rent control, housing subsidies, supportive services for renters, updating housing codes to include unconventional and wheeled housing and they oppose homeless sweeps. All with the goal to eliminate involuntary homelessness.

References

Political parties in Washington (state)

Washington (state)
State and local socialist parties in the United States